Shreya Dhital (born 12 April 1995) is a Nepalese swimmer who represented Nepal at the 2012 Summer Olympics. Shreya Dhital has grabbed 13 medals, including 11 golds in the 11th Galaxy Cup Swimming Championship. In the 200m open girl’s medley, Dhital clocked 3.16.35 mins, in 50m freestyle she had 33.28 secs and 41.85 secs in backstroke. She also competed in the 2009 and 2011 World Aquatics Championships.

References

External links
 

1995 births
Living people
Sportspeople from Kathmandu
Olympic swimmers of Nepal
Nepalese female swimmers
Swimmers at the 2012 Summer Olympics
21st-century Nepalese women